The 1892 (spring) California Golden Bears football team was an American football team that represented the University of California, Berkeley. The team competed as an independent during the spring of 1892 against teams from the Bay Area. It was Cal's final team without a head coach and compiled a record of 4–2. This season was the first time Cal played against Stanford, establishing that match as the first instance of the Big Game.

Schedule

References

California
California Golden Bears football seasons
California Golden Bears football